John Moore (1788 – June 17, 1867) was an American statesman and planter from Louisiana. He served in the United States House of Representatives from 1840 to 1843 and again from 1851 to 1853. He was a lifelong member of the United States Whig Party.

Biography
John Moore was born in 1788 in Berkeley County, Virginia (now part of West Virginia). He moved to Franklin, Louisiana for his education.

Political career 
Moore was elected to the Louisiana House of Representatives for St. Mary Parish in 1825. He held that seat until 1834.

Congress 
He was first elected to the United States Congress to replace Rice Garland and took his seat on December 17, 1840. He was re-elected in the general election and served until March 3, 1843.

Later career and death 
Moore moved to Iberia Parish and married Mary Weeks, widow of the builder of the plantation Shadows-on-the-Teche. He was elected to the United States Congress again in 1850, serving a single term in 1851 to 1853; he was the last Whig elected to Congress from Louisiana. In 1861 Moore was a delegate to the Louisiana secession convention.

He died in Franklin, Louisiana on June 17, 1867, and was buried on his estate.

References

Moore's Congressional Biography

1788 births
1867 deaths
19th-century American politicians
Members of the Louisiana House of Representatives
American planters
Date of birth missing
People from Iberia Parish, Louisiana
People from Berkeley County, West Virginia
People from Franklin, Louisiana
Whig Party members of the United States House of Representatives from Louisiana
American slave owners